Suvereto is a comune (municipality) in the Province of Livorno in the Italian region Tuscany, located about  southwest of Florence and about  southeast of Livorno.

Government
Frazioni  
The municipality is formed by the municipal seat of Suvereto and the villages (frazioni) of Belvedere, Montioni, Prata and San Lorenzo. The small hamlets of Forni, Poggio al Turco, San Lorenzo Due, Tabarò and Valdamone are also included in the municipality.

Main sights
Rocca Aldobrandesca, ruins of a castle built in the mid-12th century near 9th century fortifications. 
Pieve of San Giusto, a pleban church in Romanesque style
Countryside church of Santissima Annunziata
Church of the Crucifix
Natural Park of Montioni

Infrastructure
 Static inverter plant of HVDC SACOI, the HVDC-power cable connecting the power grids of Corse and Sardinia with the grid of the Italian mainland.

References

Cities and towns in Tuscany